Achryson chacoense is a species of longhorn beetle in the Cerambycinae subfamily. It was described by Di Iorio in 2003. It is known from Argentina.

References

Achrysonini
Beetles described in 2003